Chlanidophora  is a genus of moths of the family Noctuidae; it was historically misclassified, but in 2010 was determined to belong to the subfamily Agaristinae.

References

Agaristinae